The Giro del Friuli-Venezia Giulia is a professional cycling race held annually in Italy. It is part of UCI Europe Tour in category 2.2.

Winners

References

Cycle races in Italy
UCI Europe Tour races
Recurring sporting events established in 1962
1962 establishments in Italy